Hue Park (born Park Chun-hyu) is a South Korean lyricist and musical theatre writer.

Early career as lyricist 
Park started working as an in-house lyricist for Music Cube while he was still attending Dongguk University for creative writing (now merged with the Korean Literature program). He debuted as a lyricist with works such as the singer Evan's Pain Reliever, Park Sang-min's Tough Life. Park then moved to New York City to study visual art at New York University, where he met and collaborated with composer Will Aronson, thus beginning his career in musical theatre.

Works in musical theatre 
In July 2012, Park wrote lyrics for the musical Bungee Jump (music by Will Aronson). The show was successful, and Aronson and Park gained considerable recognition. For the second production of Bungee Jump in 2013, Park joined Aronson in the script's adaptation. Park also adapted, translated, and wrote Korean lyrics for the Musical Carmen in December 2013, which opened at LG Art Center.

Hue Park received the Best Music/Lyrics Award at Korea's 2013 Musical Awards for Bungee Jump. Bungee Jump was also named one of 'the 2 Best Original Musicals of 2012' by 'The Musical' Magazine, as well as selected for re-production by the Korean Musical Association's original musical support program.

He went on to write the script and lyrics for The Schwarz Show: Christmas Radio within the omnibus musical I Hate Christmas in Project Box SEEYA.

In 2016, he translated and wrote Korean lyrics for The Bodyguard Musical, which also opened at LG Art Center.

Park and Aronson had a try-out production of their new musical, Maybe Happy Ending, at Wooran Foundation in September 2015. The musical was premiered by DaeMyoung Culture Factory in December 2016. The show won 6 Korean Musical Awards, including Best Music, Lyrics and Book. The English-language version of Maybe Happy Ending was awarded the 2017 Richard Rodgers Award by the American Academy of Arts and Letters. A new Korean production opened in 2018. In 2020, Maybe Happy Ending had its American premier at the Alliance Theatre in Atlanta from Jan 18-Feb 16.

Awards

Graphic design and writing 
 Published a photoessay book, Polaroidiary (2011) 
 Designed the title art and poster for Bungee Jump, the poster for Omnibus Musical I Hate Christmas, the cover for The Musical Magazine, among other graphic design projects.
 Wrote articles and reviews as New York correspondent for The Musical Magazine  (2014)

References 

1983 births
Living people
South Korean lyricists